Ausgram may refer to:
Ausgram, Bardhaman, a village in Ausgram II CD Block in Bardhaman district, West Bengal, India
Ausgram I, a community development block, an administrative division in Bardhaman Sadar North subdivision of Bardhaman district in the Indian state of West Bengal
Ausgram II, a community development block, an administrative division in Bardhaman Sadar North subdivision of Bardhaman district in the Indian state of West Bengal
Ausgram (Vidhan Sabha constituency)